SMC may refer to:

Organisations
 Special Metals Corporation, an alloy manufacturer
 Supreme Muslim Council, former organization in Mandatory Palestine
 San Miguel Corporation, a Philippine conglomerate
 Samsung Medical Center, a hospital in South Korea
 Salmaniya Medical Complex, a hospital in Bahrain
 SMC Corporation, a Japanese industrial automation company
 Social Marketing Company, a Bangladeshi non-profit organisation
 Suzuki Motor Corporation, a Japanese multinational corporation
 Swathanthra Malayalam Computing, a software collective in India
 Scottish Mountaineering Club
 Sufi Muslim Council, UK

Education
 St. Michael's College, Iligan City, Philippines
 Santa Monica College, California, US
 Sargodha Medical College, Punjab, Pakistan
 Senior Military College, any of six US colleges that offer ROTC programs
 Southwestern Michigan College, US
 Spartanburg Methodist College, South Carolina, US
 Stanley Medical College, Chennai, India
 Stewart's Melville College, Edinburgh, Scotland
 Swiss Management Center, a university in Switzerland

Government and politics
 Science Media Centre, UK press office
 Space and Missile Systems Center, the research and development command of the United States Space Force
 Surat Municipal Corporation, Gujarat, India
 Supreme Military Council (Ghana), ruling Ghana from 1975–1979
 Modern Centre Party (Stranka modernega centra), a Slovenian political party

Arts and entertainment

Music
 Seattle Men's Chorus, Washington, US
 SMC Recordings, San Francisco, California, US

Television
 Shaw Multicultural Channel, a cable television channel in Vancouver, British Columbia, Canada
 Southern Media Corporation, a Cantonese television network in Guangdong, China

Other entertainment
 Secret Maryo Chronicles, a video game

Science and technology
 Seasonal malaria chemoprevention
 Sheet moulding compound or sheet moulding composite, a reinforced polyester material
 Small Magellanic Cloud, a galaxy near the Milky Way
 SMC protein (Structural Maintenance of Chromosomes)
Supplementary motor cortex, a part of the sensorimotor cortex
Smooth muscle cell, a cell of involuntary non-striated muscle

Computing and electronics
 Sound and music computing
 Apple SMC, a video codec
 Secure multi-party computation, a cryptography problem
 Sequential Monte Carlo method, a set of algorithms
 Self-modifying code, code which modifies itself at load or runtime
 Sliding mode control, in control theory
 SMC connector, used in radio-frequency circuits
 Surface-mount component, in electronics
 .smc, a file format used for Super Nintendo Entertainment System ROM images
 System Management Controller, on Apple computers
 DO-214AB, a variant of DO-214 semiconductor package

Other uses
Semarang Poncol railway station, Semarang, Indonesia (station code: SMC)
Senior Mathematical Challenge, for students run by the United Kingdom Mathematics Trust
Single-member constituency
Speak Mandarin Campaign, Singapore
Stade Malherbe Caen, a French football club